Malian (also Romanized as Malīān, Malīyān, Malyān, and Melyan) is a village in Kamazan-e Sofla Rural District, Zand District, Malayer County, Hamadan Province, Iran. At the 2006 census, its population was 125, in 30 families.

References 

Populated places in Malayer County